El Paraíso is a parish located in the Libertador Bolivarian Municipality, central of the city of Caracas, Venezuela.

References

Parishes of Capital District (Venezuela)